Celso Capdevila (born March 14, 1984 in Mariano Roque Alonso, Paraguay) is a Paraguayan 
Association Football Goalkeeper currently playing for Sportivo Italiano of the Primera B Metropolitana in Argentina.

Teams
  2 de Mayo 2006-2008
  12 de Octubre 2008-2010
  Sportivo Italiano 2010
  12 de Octubre 2011
  Sportivo Italiano 2011–2012
  Sportivo Iteño 2018

External links
 
 

1984 births
Living people
Paraguayan people of Catalan descent
People from Mariano Roque Alonso
Paraguayan footballers
Paraguayan expatriate footballers
12 de Octubre Football Club players
Sportivo Italiano footballers
Expatriate footballers in Argentina
Association football goalkeepers
2 de Mayo footballers